Gita Kamath, an Australian diplomat, is the High Commissioner of Australia to South Africa, since March 2019.

Background and career
Kamath graduated with a Bachelor of Arts and a Bachelor of Laws, University of New South Wales; a Graduate Diploma in Legal Practice, University of Technology Sydney; and a Master of Arts (Foreign Affairs and Trade), from the Australian National University. She commenced her career practicing as a lawyer with Clayton Utz.

Kamath is a senior career officer with the Department of Foreign Affairs and Trade.

References

High Commissioners of Australia to South Africa
University of New South Wales alumni
University of Technology Sydney alumni
Australian National University alumni
Living people
Year of birth missing (living people)